Sibusiso Shongwe (born 9 September 2001) is a South African rugby union player for the  in the Currie Cup. His regular position is prop.

Shongwe was named in the  side for the 2022 Currie Cup Premier Division.

References

South African rugby union players
Living people
Rugby union props
Golden Lions players
2001 births